Pseudancistrus orinoco is a species of catfish in the family Loricariidae. It is native to South America, where it occurs in the Orinoco basin. The species reaches 10 cm (3.9 inches) in total length. 

P. orinoco sometimes appears in the aquarium trade, where it is typically known either as the large-snouted pleco or by its associated L-number, which is L-126. While initially described as Lithoxancistrus orinoco (a name which is still used for the species by some sources), it was reclassified as a member of Pseudancistrus by Jonathan W. Armbruster of Auburn University in 2004.

References 

Fish described in 1988
orinoco